Statsmodels is a Python package that allows users to explore data, estimate statistical models, and perform statistical tests. An extensive list of descriptive statistics, statistical tests, plotting functions, and result statistics are available for different types of data and each estimator. It complements SciPy's stats module.

Statsmodels is part of the Python scientific stack that is oriented towards data analysis, data science and statistics. Statsmodels is built on top of the numerical libraries NumPy and SciPy, integrates with Pandas for data handling, and uses Patsy for an R-like formula interface. Graphical functions are based on the Matplotlib library. Statsmodels provides the statistical backend for other Python libraries. Statsmodels is free software released under the Modified BSD (3-clause) license.

References

Free statistical software
Python (programming language) scientific libraries